The 36th Filmfare Awards were held in 1991.

Dil and Ghayal led the ceremony with eight nominations each, followed by Aashiqui with seven nominations and Agneepath and Pratibandh with five nominations each.

Ghayal won seven awards, including Best Film, Best Director (for Rajkumar Santoshi) and Best Actor (for Sunny Deol), thus becoming the most-awarded film at the ceremony.

Madhuri Dixit won her first of four awards for Best Actress for her performance in Dil.

Main awards

Best Film
 Ghayal 
Agneepath
Dil
Pratibandh

Best Director
 Rajkumar Santoshi – Ghayal 
Mahesh Bhatt – Aashiqui
Mukul Anand – Agneepath
Ravi Raja – Pratibandh

Best Actor
 Sunny Deol – Ghayal 
Aamir Khan – Dil
Amitabh Bachchan – Agneepath
Chiranjeevi – Pratibandh

Best Actress
 Madhuri Dixit – Dil 
Hema Malini – Rihaee
Juhi Chawla – Pratibandh
Meenakshi Sheshadri – Jurm

Best Supporting Actor
 Mithun Chakraborty – Agneepath 
Anupam Kher – Dil
Om Puri – Ghayal
Rami Reddy – Pratibandh

Best Supporting Actress
 Rohini Hattangadi – Agneepath 
Raadhika – Aaj Ka Arjun
Reema Lagoo – Aashiqui
Sangeeta Bijlani – Jurm

Best Comic Actor
 Kader Khan – Baap Numbri Beta Dus Numbri

Lux New Face of the Year
 Pooja Bhatt – Daddy

Best Story
 Ghayal – Rajkumar Santoshi

Best Screenplay
 Kamla Ki Maut – Basu Chatterjee

Best Dialogue
 Daddy – Suraj Sanim

Best Music Director 
 Aashiqui – Nadeem Shravan 
Aaj Ka Arjun – Bappi Lahiri
Baaghi: A Rebel for Love – Anand–Milind
Dil – Anand–Milind

Best Lyricist
 Aashiqui – Sameer for Nazar Ke Saamne 
Aashiqui – Rani Malik for Dheere Dheere
Dil – Sameer for Na Jaane Kahan

Best Playback Singer, Male
 Aashiqui – Kumar Sanu for Ab Tere Bin 
Baaghi: A Rebel for Love – Amit Kumar for Kaisa Lagta Hai
Dil – Suresh Wadkar for O Priya

Best Playback Singer, Female
 Aashiqui – Anuradha Paudwal for Nazar Ke Saamne 
Baaghi: A Rebel for Love – Kavita Krishnamurthy for Chandni Raat
Dil – Anuradha Paudwal for Mujhe Neend Na Aaye

Best Art Direction
 Ghayal

Best Choreography
 Sailaab – Saroj Khan for Hum Ko Aaj

Best Cinematography
 Ghayal

Best Editing
 Ghayal

Best Sound
 E. Rudra – Azaad Desh Ke Ghulam

Lifetime Achievement Award
 Amitabh Bachchan

Critics' awards

Best Film
 Kasba

Outstanding Performance in a Non-commercial Film
 Anupam Kher – Daddy

Special Jury Mention
 Aadhi Haqeeqat, Aadha Fasana  – Dilip Ghosh

Best Documentary
 Amjad Ali Khan

Most wins
Ghayal – 7/8
Aashiqui – 4/7
Agneepath – 2/5
Daddy – 2/2
Dil – 1/8

See also
38th Filmfare Awards
37th Filmfare Awards
Filmfare Awards

External links
http://www.imdb.com/event/ev0000245/1991/

Filmfare Awards
Filmfare